Bocourt's ameiva (Medopheos edracanthus) is a species of lizard in the family Teiidae . It is found in Ecuador and Peru.

References 

Teiidae
Reptiles described in 1874
Taxa named by Marie Firmin Bocourt